Auburn is a locality in the Western Downs Region, Queensland, Australia.

Auburn's postcode is 4413.

Geography

The Auburn Homestead is located within the locality and may be the origin of the locality name.

References 

Western Downs Region
Localities in Queensland